This is a list of places in Azerbaijan which have standing links to local communities in other countries known as "town twinning" (usually in Europe) or "sister cities" (usually in the rest of the world).

B
Baku

 Basra, Iraq
 Bordeaux, France
 Dakar, Senegal
 Honolulu, United States
 Houston, United States
 İzmir, Turkey
 Jeddah, Saudi Arabia
 Kyiv, Ukraine
 Ljubljana, Slovenia
 Moscow, Russia
 Naples, Italy
 Pretoria, South Africa
 Rio de Janeiro, Brazil
 Saint Petersburg, Russia
 Sarajevo, Bosnia and Herzegovina
 Tabriz, Iran
 Tbilisi, Georgia

G
Ganja

 Derbent, Russia
 Kars, Turkey
 Kutaisi, Georgia
 Moscow, Russia
 Newark, United States
 Olomouc Region, Czech Republic
 Ordu, Turkey
 Tabriz, Iran

Gədəbəy
 Stillwater, United States

Goychay

 Lida, Belarus
 Valmontone, Italy

I
Ismayilli

 Itō, Japan
 Kiryat Bialik, Israel
 Nyasvizh, Belarus

L
Lankaran
 Monterey, United States

M
Mingachevir

 Afula, Israel
 Gölbaşı, Turkey
 Kahramanmaraş, Turkey
 Kars, Turkey
 Orhangazi, Turkey
 Polotsk, Belarus

N
Naftalan
 Yessentuki, Russia

Nakhchivan

 Batumi, Georgia
 Brest, Belarus

Q
Qazax

 Bolu, Turkey
 Trakai, Lithuania

S
Salyan
 Kahramanmaraş, Turkey

Shaki

 Gabrovo, Bulgaria
 Giresun, Turkey
 Göynük, Turkey
 Lapseki, Turkey
 Meram, Turkey
 Slutsk, Belarus
 Telavi, Georgia

Shamakhi

 Iğdır, Turkey
 Tirat Carmel, Israel

Sharur
 Iğdır, Turkey 

Shusha

 Kayseri, Turkey
 Turkistan, Kazakhstan

Sumgait

 Aktau, Kazakhstan
 Białystok, Poland
 Ceyhan, Turkey
 Cherkasy, Ukraine
 Keçiören, Turkey
 Ludwigshafen am Rhein, Germany
 Mogilev, Belarus
 Nevinnomyssk, Russia
 Quzhou, China
 Rustavi, Georgia

T
Tovuz
 Cognac, France

References

Azerbaijan
Azerbaijan
Foreign relations of Azerbaijan
Azerbaijan geography-related lists